Denis Markaj (born 20 February 1991) is a Kosovor professional footballer who plays as a full-back for Swiss club FC Rapperswil-Jona.

International career
On 7 October 2015, Markaj received a call-up from Kosovo for a friendly match against Equatorial Guinea and made his debut after coming on as a substitute in the 57th minute in place of Leart Paqarada.

References

External links

1991 births
Living people
Sportspeople from Gjakova
Kosovan emigrants to Switzerland
Association football fullbacks
Kosovan footballers
Kosovo international footballers
FC Baden players
FC Chiasso players
AC Bellinzona players
FC Lugano players
FC Aarau players
FC Winterthur players
FC Le Mont players
FC Rapperswil-Jona players
Swiss Challenge League players
Swiss Promotion League players
Kosovan expatriate footballers
Expatriate footballers in Switzerland
Kosovan expatriate sportspeople in Switzerland